The 44th edition of the annual Clásico RCN was held from October 17 to October 24, 2004 in Colombia. The stage race started in Bucaramanga and finished with an individual time trial at the Alto del Escobero.

Stages

2004-10-17: Bucaramanga – Bucaramanga (6.8 km)

2004-10-18: Socorro – Duitama (213 km)

2004-10-19: Duitama – Zipaquirá (173.6 km)

2004-10-20: Soacha – Ibagué (191.8 km)

2004-10-21: Ibagué – Buga (200 km)

2004-10-22: Buga – Pereira (135.4 km)

2004-10-23: Dosquebradas – Sabaneta (191.6 km)

2004-10-24: Envigado – Alto del Escobero (10.4 km)

Final classification

Teams 

Cafés Baqué-Orbitel

Lotería de Boyacá-Servientrega

Gobernación de Norte de Santander-Selle Italia

Aguardiente Antioqueño-Lotería de Medellín

Inder Pereira-Indeportes Risaralda

Chocolate Sol

Cicloases Cundinamarca

05 Orbitel

Servientrega-Lotería de Boyacá

Equipo Mixto Antioquia

Equipo Mixto Boyacá-Cundinamarca

Equipo Mixto Regional

See also 
 2004 Vuelta a Colombia

References 
 Clásico RCN 2004 (Part one)
 Clásico RCN 2004 (Part two)

Clásico RCN
Clasico RCN
Clasico RCN